Louisiana Highway 840 is a collection of two current state highways which serve Monroe and West Monroe in Ouachita Parish, and three deleted state highways.



Current routes

Louisiana Highway 840-1 

Louisiana Highway 840-1 (LA 840-1) spans  from west to east and is known as Smith Street.  It connects LA 3033 to LA 34. Before the 1955 Louisiana Highway renumbering, LA 840-1 was signed as State Route 2185. It also served as the southern terminus of LA 617, signed as State Route 1607. The northern terminus of LA 617 has since been shifted north by two blocks.

Junction list

Louisiana Highway 840-6 

Louisiana Highway 840-6 (LA 840-6) spans  from south to north and is known as North 18th Street and Forsythe Avenue.  From the west, LA 840-6 begins as a state highway at an intersection with US 80/US 165 Business in Monroe.  It heads north as a four-lane highway. The roadway south of this intersection is signed as TO I-20, and is known as North 18th Street.

Heading north, LA 840-6 passes through many banks and restaurants. It turns to the right at an intersection with Forsythe Avenue, which picks up LA 840-6 and heads east. Forsythe Avenue has many upscale shops and restaurants and is one of the prized thoroughfares through Monroe.

After crossing Bayou DeSiard, Forsythe Avenue turns into Forsythe Bypass, carrying LA 840-6 to its eastern terminus at US 165.

Before the 1955 Louisiana Highway renumbering, LA 840-6 was signed as State Route 1927; it followed along Forsythe Avenue, however, instead of Forsythe Extension.

Junction list

Deleted routes

Louisiana Highway 840-3 

Louisiana Highway 840-3 (LA 840-3) was a state highway in West Monroe. It spanned  from south to north and is currently known as North 7th Street.  It connected  LA 34 on its original routing along Natchitoches Street to US 80. LA 840-3 was removed when LA 34 was rerouted along its current path, and the piece north of LA 34 was designated as a southern extension of LA 143.

Junction list

Louisiana Highway 840-4 

Louisiana Highway 840-4 (LA 840-4) was a state highway in Monroe. It spanned  from south to north and is currently known as South Grand Street.  It connected US 165 Business to Vernon Street, providing access to the Louisiana Institute for Boys and E.A. Conway Medical Center, which US 165 bypassed when it was rerouted along Jackson Street. LA 840-4 was removed sometime in the mid-1960s.

Junction list

Louisiana Highway 840-5 

Louisiana Highway 840-5 (LA 840-5) was a state highway in Monroe. It spanned  from west to east and is currently known as Desiard Street.  It connected downtown Monroe to US 165, but was eventually truncated before the 1955 Louisiana Highway renumbering to 26th Street. When LA 840-5 was created, it connected North 26th Street to US 165. It was deleted in 1957.

Junction list

See also

External links

LADOTD Map of Numbered Highways in Ouachita Parish
Louisiana State Highway Log

0840
Transportation in Ouachita Parish, Louisiana
Transportation in Monroe, Louisiana